Events in the year 2021 in Chad.

Incumbents
President: Idriss Déby (until April 20)

Events
Ongoing — COVID-19 pandemic in Chad
6 February – Police in N’Djamena fire tear gas and make several arrests as hundreds set tires on fire and protest against President Déby's nomination to run for a sixth term in April.
16 February – Chad deploys 1,200 troops to the ″tri-border region″ of Niger, Mali and Burkina Faso during the G5 Sahel summit.
28 February – Opposition leader Yaya Dillo says his mother, son, and three other members of his family were killed in a pre-dawn raid on his house led by the president's son. A government spokesperson said that Dillo had failed to respond to two judicial mandates, and that two people were killed and five injured, including three police officers.
3 April – The Niger human rights commission calls for an independent inquiry following alleged rapes, including that of an 11-year-old girl, by Chadian soldiers deployed to help fight armed groups.
11 April – The Northern Chad offensive begins, a day after the 2021 Chadian presidential election.
19 April – President Idriss Déby wins the 2021 Chadian presidential election for his sixth term.
20 April – President Idriss Déby is killed one day after it was announced that he had won the election.

24 October – The  2021 Chadian parliamentary election was again delayed until September, 2022.

Deaths
January 22 – Routouang Yoma Golom, militant and politician, MP (since 2011).
April 20 – Idriss Déby, politician, president (since 1990)

References

 
2020s in Chad
Years of the 21st century in Chad
Chad
Chad